Donghuayuan North railway station
is a railway station located in People's Republic of China.

It is a station on the Beijing-Zhangjiakou intercity railway, opening on December 30, 2019.

References

Stations on the Beijing–Zhangjiakou Intercity Railway
Railway stations in China opened in 2019